Tyson Demos (born 3 July 1988) is an Australian former professional basketball player and one-time assistant coach in the National Basketball League (NBL). He played nine seasons in the NBL with the Gold Coast Blaze and Illawarra Hawks.

Early life and career
Born and bred in the Illawarra region, Demos is a junior product of the Illawarra Basketball Association and attended the Australian Institute of Sport. He also represented Australia at the 2007 FIBA Under-19 World Championship in Serbia.

NBL career
Demos signed his first professional contract with the Gold Coast Blaze in 2007. He played three seasons with the Blaze before returning home and joining the Wollongong Hawks for the 2010–11 NBL season. He played six seasons with the Hawks, with his sixth and final season seeing him play in just six games after sustaining a knee injury in November 2015. He subsequently sat out the 2016–17 NBL season and did not return to the league.

During his NBL career, Demos played in various state leagues during the off-seasons. Between 2008 and 2010, he played in the SEABL for the Brisbane Spartans; between 2011 and 2012, he played in the Waratah League for the Illawarra Hawks; and in 2015, he played in the QBL for the Mackay Meteors and won a championship.

Demos' final stint came in 2017 with the Illawarra Hawks in the Waratah League.

Coaching career
On 30 August 2019, Demos was appointed assistant coach of the Illawarra Hawks for the 2019–20 NBL season.

References

External links
Illawarra Hawks profile
NBL stats

1988 births
Living people
Australian men's basketball players
Gold Coast Blaze players
Illawarra Hawks players
Shooting guards
Wollongong Hawks players
Australian people of Greek descent
20th-century Australian people
21st-century Australian people